The Ealing comedies is an informal name for a series of comedy films produced by the London-based Ealing Studios during a ten-year period from 1947 to 1957. Often considered to reflect Britain's post-war spirit, the most celebrated films in the sequence include Kind Hearts and Coronets (1949), Whisky Galore! (1949), The Lavender Hill Mob (1951), The Man in the White Suit (1951) and The Ladykillers (1955). Hue and Cry (1947) is generally considered to be the earliest of the cycle, and Barnacle Bill (1957) the last, although some sources list Davy (1958) as the final Ealing comedy.

History

Relatively few comedy films were made at Ealing Studios until several years after World War II. The 1939 film Cheer Boys Cheer, featuring the rivalry between two brewing companies, one big and modernist, the other small and traditional, has been characterised as a prototype of later films. One of the few other films that can be seen as a direct precursor to the Ealing comedies is Saloon Bar (1940), in which the regulars of a public house join forces to clear the name of the barmaid's boyfriend who has been accused of murder. Other wartime comedies featuring actors such as Tommy Trinder, Will Hay and George Formby were generally in a broader music hall tradition and had little in common with the later Ealing comedy films. Ealing made no comedy films at all in 1945 and 1946.

Comedies
T.E.B. Clarke wrote the screenplay for Hue and Cry (1947), about a group of schoolboys who confront a criminal gang, which proved to be a critical and commercial success. It was followed by three films with Celtic themes: Another Shore (1948), about the fantasies of a bored Dublin customs official, A Run for Your Money (1949), depicting the adventures of two inexperienced Welshman in London for an important rugby international, and Whisky Galore!, (1949) about Scottish islanders during the Second World War who discover that a freighter with a large cargo of whisky has run aground.

Kind Hearts and Coronets (1949) is a dark comedy in which the son of an impoverished branch of the aristocratic D'Ascoyne family murders eight other members, all of whom are played by Alec Guinness, in order to inherit the family dukedom and gain revenge on his snobbish relations. In Passport to Pimlico (1949) the inhabitants of the London neighbourhood of Pimlico attempt to create their own independent nation state and end rationing, leading to a variety of unexpected problems and diplomatic incidents with the British government.

The Magnet (1950), set in Liverpool, is about a boy whose acquisition of a magnet leads to a series of adventures in the city. In The Lavender Hill Mob (1951) a timid bank clerk gets together an unlikely gang of accomplices to snatch a delivery of gold bullion. The armed robbery proves surprisingly successful, but things start to go wrong when they attempt to melt down their haul into model Eiffel Towers. The Man in the White Suit (1951) features the efforts of a zealous young scientist to create a new kind of clothing material that will never get dirty and never wear out – an invention that threatens the livelihoods of both big business and the trade unions who join forces to try to prevent the publication of this new discovery.

The Titfield Thunderbolt (1953) echoes the theme of Passport to Pimlico, switched to a rural setting, with a small community standing up for their local interests when their branch line is threatened with closure by British Railways in a forerunner of the Beeching cuts a decade later. The villagers join forces to keep their railway running, but face competition and sabotage from a rival bus company. 

Meet Mr. Lucifer (1953) follows a television set as it is passed on from one owner to another, causing dissatisfaction wherever it goes. The film serves as a warning about the effects of rapidly expanding television use.

The Love Lottery (1954) sees a matinee idol Hollywood star, played by David Niven, agree to take part in a "love lottery". The Maggie (1954) features a clash of culture and wills between a wily Scottish boat captain and a vigorous American business tycoon who has mistakenly contracted the boat to carry a cargo for him. In The Ladykillers (1955) a gang of criminals rent a room from the elderly Mrs Wilberforce while they're pretending to be a string quintet looking for a space to practice. They plan to use the house to stage a robbery at nearby King's Cross railway station. On the brink of escape, they are thwarted by Mrs Wilberforce who discovers their true purpose. The gang agree that she has to be murdered before she can go to the police, but prove incapable of doing this, and begin turning on each other instead.

Later comedies
Who Done It? (1956) was the final comedy made at Ealing Studios, before it was sold to the BBC. It parodies detective fiction with a young man setting himself up in business as a private detective after receiving a windfall of £100. His confused efforts to solve a crime lead to his becoming entangled in cold war espionage. The film was closer in style to traditional 1930s comedy, rather than the type of films Ealing had become known for over the previous decade.

Two final comedies were released under the Ealing banner, but made at Elstree Studios. Barnacle Bill (1957) follows Captain Ambrose who, after leaving the navy, buys a run-down pier on the English seaside. Ambrose tries to revive the pier crossing swords with the local council who have a scheme to redevelop the entire seafront, personally enriching themselves while ruining him. Ambrose battles them by severing his connection with the shore, registering his pier as a ship under a foreign flag, and marketing it as a tourist destination for those too seasick to go on cruises. In Davy (1958) a promising entertainer tries to decide whether to strike out on his own, or stay with his family's struggling music hall act. No further comedies were made by Ealing, and after the thriller Siege of Pinchgut (1959), the brand was absorbed into the wider Rank Organisation.
The previous year Rank had released Rockets Galore!, a sequel to Whisky Galore!, but its production was unconnected with Ealing.

Personnel
Many of the films were built around a repertory group of actors, screenwriters, directors and technicians. Directors were Alexander Mackendrick, Charles Crichton, Robert Hamer, Charles Frend, Anthony Pelissier and Henry Cornelius. Notable actors who became prolific in these films included Stanley Holloway, Alec Guinness, Raymond Huntley and Alastair Sim. A number of actors also appeared frequently in smaller roles such as Philip Stainton and Edie Martin.

Legacy
Though Ealing Studios has come to be remembered for its comedies, they were only a tenth of its productions.  Conversely, Gainsborough Pictures is associated with the Gainsborough melodramas though it also produced many comedies. 

The Ealing Comedies, a documentary examining the films and featuring interviews with many key players, was screened as part of BBC1's Tuesday Documentary strand in April 1971.

Two Ealing comedies were adapted for radio and broadcast over BBC Radio 4: Kind Hearts and Coronets in 1990 starring Robert Powell and Timothy Bateson and in 2007 starring Michael Kitchen and Harry Enfield, and The Ladykillers in 1996 starring Edward Petherbridge.

List of Ealing comedy films

References

Bibliography
 Burton, Alan & O'Sullivan, Tim. The Cinema of Basil Dearden and Michael Relph. Edinburgh University Press, 2009.
 Murphy, Robert. Realism and Tinsel: Cinema and Society in Britain 1939-48. Routledge, 1992.
 Sweet, Matthew. Shepperton Babylon: The Lost Worlds of British Cinema. Faber and Faber, 2005.

Film series introduced in 1947
Ealing Studios films
Comedy film series
Lists of British films
1940s in British cinema
1950s in British cinema